Xhevdet Bajraj (Serbo-Croat: Dževdet Bajraj; 1960 – 22 June 2022) was an ethnic Albanian Kosovar poet and screenwriter who resided in Mexico.

Biography
Born in [[Socialist Autonomous Province of Kosovo, Bajraj was granted residency in Mexico as a refugee thanks to the International Parliament of Writers that offered him the options of France, Italy or Mexico. He fled the war in the Kosovo for a more peaceful Mexico City where he resided with his wife (a physician) and two children.

Bajraj died on 22 June 2022 in Mexico City due to a brain tumor.

Books
El tamaño del dolor ("The size of the pain", 2005)
Ruego albanés ("Albanian plea", 2000)
Slaying the Mosquito, 2017

Screenplays
Aro Tolbukhin, en la mente del asesino ("Aro Tolbukin, in the mind of the assassin", 2002)

See also
Mexican literature
Cinema of Mexico

References

External links
Bajraj at the Goethe-Institut in Mexico 
Vine a aprender español y para leer a Octavio Paz ("I came to learn Spanish and to read Octavio Paz"), article from El Universal 
Review of Ruego albanés 

1960 births
2022 deaths 
Deaths from lung cancer in Mexico
Kosovan poets
Kosovan screenwriters
Mexican screenwriters
Mexican male poets
Yugoslav poets
Mexican people of Albanian descent
Mexican people of Kosovan descent
Kosovan refugees
20th-century Mexican male writers